The 2014 Copa Verde was the 1st edition of a football competition held in the Brazil. Featuring 16 clubs, with Pará has three vacancies; Amazonas, Distrito Federal and Mato Grosso with two each and Acre, Amapá, Espírito Santo, Mato Grosso do Sul, Rondônia, Roraima and Tocantins. The champion earned the spot in the 2015 Copa Sudamericana.

Brasília won the final over Paysandu. However, on July 28, 2014, the title was awarded to Paysandu, due to irregularities of the squad of Brasília. Brasília appealed against this decision, and obtained a suspension which reversed this decision temporarily. A final decision by the Superior Court of Sports Justice (STJD) declared Brasília as the champion.

Qualified teams

Bracket

Finals

Tied 3–3 on aggregate, Brasília won on penalties.

References 

2014
2014 in Brazilian football